is a 2,418m tall mountain on the border of Nagano and Yamanashi prefectures in Japan. It is a famous rock climbing area.  The rock in Ogawayama consists of granite.

Some famous boulders can be found in Ogawayama. Such as Captain Ahab, the first boulder problem opened in Japan in 1980, and the notorious Banshousha slab boulder.  There is multipitch climbing up to 9 pitches. The routes are generally not bolted.

References

External links
 Bouldering in Ogawayama (UKClimbing.com), article about Ogawayama bouldering by Jonas Wiklund.
 Ogawayama in English, online climbing guide to Ogawayama

Mountains of Nagano Prefecture
Climbing areas of Japan
Mountains of Yamanashi Prefecture